This is a list of films produced in Pakistan in 1951 (see 1951 in film):

1951

See also
1951 in Pakistan

External links
 Search Pakistani film - IMDB.com

1951
Pakistani
Films